David Bryan Benoit (born August 18, 1953) is an American jazz pianist, composer and producer, based in Los Angeles, California, United States. Benoit has charted over 25 albums since 1980, and has been nominated for three Grammy Awards.  He is also music director for the Pacific Vision Youth Symphony (previously known as the Asia America Symphony Orchestra) and the Asia America Youth Orchestra. Furthermore, crediting Vince Guaraldi as an inspiration, Benoit has participated both as performer and music director for the later animated adaptations of the Peanuts comic strip, such as the feature film, The Peanuts Movie, restoring Guaraldi's musical signature to the franchise.

Early life
David Bryan Benoit was born in Bakersfield, California, on August 18, 1953. He studied piano at age 13 with Marya Cressy Wright and continued his training with Abraham Fraser, who was the pianist for Arturo Toscanini. He attended Mira Costa High School. He focused on theory and composition at El Camino College, studying orchestration with Donald Nelligan, and later took film scoring classes taught by Donald Ray at UCLA. His education in music conducting began with Heiichiro Ohyama, assistant conductor of the L.A. Philharmonic, and continued with Jan Robertson, head of the conducting department at UCLA. He worked with Jeffrey Schindler, Music Director for the UC Santa Barbara symphony orchestra.

Career
He began his career as a musical director and conductor for Lainie Kazan in 1976, before moving on to similar roles with singer/actresses Ann-Margret and Connie Stevens.

His GRP Records debut album, Freedom at Midnight (1987), made it to number 5 on Billboard'''s Top Contemporary Jazz Albums chart. Benoit also says that it was his favorite album to produce, because it was when "everything came together," as he stated in an interview on SmoothViews.com. An earlier "live in the studio" (direct record, no mixing or overdubs) album on Spindletop Records, This Side Up (previously 1986), was re-released on the GRP label.Waiting for Spring (1989) made it to number 1 on Billboard's Top Jazz Albums chart. Shadows, from 1991, made it to number 2 on the Top Contemporary Jazz Albums chart.

Out of respect for one of his main influences, Bill Evans, he dedicated his 1992 album Letter to Evan to him.

Many of his songs employ a string section, most notably on his American Landscape (1997) and Orchestral Stories (2005) albums.

In 2000, after the death of Peanuts creator Charles M. Schulz, he released a memorial album entitled Here's to You, Charlie Brown: 50 Great Years. Collaborators included the chorus group Take 6, guitarist Marc Antoine and trumpeter Chris Botti. He also did the music for "Peanuts" in the later specials, after Vince Guaraldi's death. The album made it to number 2 on the Top Jazz Albums chart. An earlier cover of Guaraldi's "Linus and Lucy", recorded in 1985 for the aforementioned album This Side Up, enjoyed notable radio airplay and helped to launch the smooth jazz genre.

Benoit has arranged, conducted, and performed music for many popular pop and jazz artists, including Russ Freeman and the Rippingtons (he was involved with the band in its formative stages, and they often appeared on each other's albums), Kenny Loggins, Michael Franks, Patti Austin, Dave Koz, Kenny Rankin, Faith Hill, David Lanz, Cece Winans, David Pack, David Sanborn, The Walt Disney Company and Brian McKnight. He paid homage to one of his chief influences, Leonard Bernstein, by playing, arranging, and performing on The Songs of West Side Story, an all-star project produced by David Pack which achieved gold sales status. Benoit contributed to the Rippingtons's debut album, Moonlighting, which was named the most influential contemporary jazz album of all time by Jazziz magazine.The Benoit/Freeman Project album was given 4 stars by AllMusic, the highest rating Benoit has received from the service, and the album made it to number 2 on the Top Contemporary Jazz Albums chart from Billboard.David Benoit. - Discography: [ Main Albums]. - Allmusic. - Retrieved: 2008-07-20

Benoit's music can be heard during The Weather Channel's "Local on the 8s" segments. His version of "Cast Your Fate to the Wind" by Vince Guaraldi is included on the album The Weather Channel Presents: Smooth Jazz II (2008). In May 2011, Benoit began hosting a morning program at jazz radio station KKJZ in Long Beach, California.

Benoit has performed at the White House for three U.S. Presidents: Bill Clinton, Ronald Reagan, and George Bush Sr. Other dignitaries he performed for include Colin Powell, Hillary Clinton, Al Gore, former Los Angeles mayors Tom Bradley and James Hahn, as well as Senator Dick Durbin.

Awards and honors
 1989: Every Step of the Way, Grammy nomination for Best Contemporary Jazz Performance
 1996: GRP All-Star Big Band, Grammy nomination for Best Large Jazz Ensemble Performance
 2000: "Dad's Room" from Professional Dreamer, Grammy nomination for Best Instrumental Composition

Discography
As leader

As sideman
 1975 The Man Incognito, Alphonse Mouzon
 1986 Moonlighting, The Rippingtons
 1988 The Real Me, Patti Austin
 1988 Lay It on the Line, Sam Riney
 1988 In Full Swing, Full Swing
 1990 This Is Me, Emily Remler
 1992 Carry On, Patti Austin
 1992 Tropical Pleasures, Kilauea
 1992 Live in L.A., The Rippingtons
 1997 The Body Remembers, Lorraine Feather
 1999 The Dance, Dave Koz
 2004 Choices, Brian Bromberg
 2014 David Pack's Napa Crossroads, David Pack
 2015 The Peanuts Movie'', Christophe Beck

References
 Some of this article comes from the Japanese-language article (accessed on April 8, 2006).

External links
 Official Website
 Complete discography
 David Benoit @ Boosey & Hawkes

American jazz pianists
American male pianists
Smooth jazz pianists
Jazz musicians from California
1953 births
Living people
Musicians from Bakersfield, California
Musicians from Los Angeles
GRP Records artists
20th-century American pianists
The Rippingtons members
21st-century American pianists
20th-century American male musicians
21st-century American male musicians
American male jazz musicians
GRP All-Star Big Band members
Mira Costa High School alumni
Peanuts music